Take Note is a musical comedy television series created by Joan Lambur and developed by Micheal Feldman that premiered on February 24, 2022, on Peacock and on February 28, 2022 on Family Channel. In June 2021, the series was green-lit for a 10-episodes.

Episodes

References

External links
 

2022 American television series debuts
2022 Canadian television series debuts
Peacock (streaming service) original programming
2020s American children's comedy television series
2020s American musical comedy television series
2020s Canadian children's television series
2020s Canadian comedy television series
American children's musical television series
Canadian children's comedy television series
Canadian children's musical television series
Family Channel (Canadian TV network) original programming
Television series about teenagers